Acacia consanguinea is a shrub of the genus Acacia and the subgenus Plurinerves that is endemism to south western Australia.

Description
It has terete and nerveless ash grey coloured branchlets with caducous stipules. Like most species of Acacia it has phyllodes rather than true leaves. It blooms from August to September and produces yellow flowers.

Taxonomy
It belongs to the Acacia fragilis group related to A. fragilis and A. uncinella.

Distribution
It is native to an area in the Goldfields-Esperance and the Wheatbelt regions of Western Australia where it is commonly situated on low rises and plains growing in gravelly sandy soils. The range of the shrub extends from around Muntadgin in the west to as far east as Coolgardie with at least one outlying population found around Wialki much further to the north where it is usually a part of scrub or heath communities.

See also
List of Acacia species

References

consanguinea
Acacias of Western Australia
Taxa named by Bruce Maslin
Plants described in 1995